Bicentennial Park is a baseball and softball stadium in Allentown, Pennsylvania.  The park, originally named after the bicentennial year in which it was renovated, was officially renamed Earl F. Hunsicker Bicentennial Park after Hunsicker's death in 1987; it was renamed ECTB Stadium at Earl F. Hunsicker Bicentennial Park in 2005. ECTB is an acronym for the Elite Championship Tournament Baseball, a youth baseball organization. The stadium and land around it are owned by the City of Allentown and currently leased to the ECTB, which in turn sub-lets the stadium to numerous community organizations which host events there throughout the year. The ballpark currently seats 4,600.

Origins
The ballpark opened in 1939 as Fairview Field, home to the Allentown Dukes, a Boston Braves Minor League farm team. The Dukes, a founding member of the Interstate League, won both the regular-season pennant and defeated the Sunbury Senators in the playoffs. The 1939 Dukes featured future Major League Baseball players Joe Antolick, George Hennessey, and Tony Parisse. 

The next year, the Dukes were replaced by the Allentown Fleetwings, which were affiliated with the St. Louis Cardinals. 

In 1941, the team as taken over by the Philadelphia Phillies and renamed again, as the Allentown Wings; they reverted to the Cardinals in 1944 and played their final season at Fairview in 1947. (Allentown would play for the Interstate League title three times in four years, in 1944, 1945 and 1947, but lost each time.) The team moved to Breadon Field, a new ballpark just north of the city in Whitehall Township, on August 6, 1948 after playing on the road until then due to construction delays.

Bicentennial Park
Fairview Field was renovated in the mid-1970s and re-opened as Bicentennial Park in 1976 for use as a softball field. The renovation effort was led by Earl F. Hunsicker who raised an estimated $1,400,000 over an 11-year period, aided by Mayor Joseph S. Daddona and the Allentown Recreation Commission.

Allentown Ambassadors

After the Eastern League's Allentown Red Sox played their final season in 1960, the city was without pro ball until the Allentown Ambassadors of the independent Northeast League arrived in 1997. However, dwindling attendance (hurt by increasingly poor on-field performance) led to owner Peter Karoly to fold the team shortly before the 2004 season; the franchise wound up as a travel team for a year (as the Northeast League Aces) before becoming the Worcester Tornadoes in 2005. Over its six seasons, twenty-one MLB players played for or managed the Ambassadors, including Ed Ott, Luis Andujar, Kim Batiste, Scott Bullett, Brian Drahman, Angelo Encarnacion, Mike Figga, Jason McDonald, Darryl Motley, and Brad Pennington.

Philadelphia Force

From 2006-09, Bicentennial Park returned to a softball configuration to host the Philadelphia Force of National Pro Fastpitch.

Land dispute and proposed demolition
In 2009, a controversy emerged over the land the stadium sits upon. LANta (Lehigh And Northampton Transportation Authority), which at the time owned 0.2 acres of the property extending from the left field parking lot to the left field base line, announced plans to build a new garage using federal stimulus money and later expand the site and buy the remaining property the stadium sits on from the city of Allentown. The plan, which would result in the demolition of the stadium, ran into opposition from the family of Earl Hunsicker as well as owner Terry Schadler, who tied up the proposal in the Allentown City Council. 

After a four-year lease renewal was awarded by City Council to new stadium owner Dylan Dando in 2016, the matter was resolved in 2017. The property in question was returned from LANTA to the City of Allentown in exchange for existing adjacent land which had been vacant and used for stadium parking, which LANTA intends to use for expansion of their existing facility near the stadium. The $13,000,000 expansion to the facility will add space vertically and allow for a compressed natural gas filling station on their property. This deal allows the stadium to remain open, although the Hunsicker family has expressed reservations based on the potential for disruption of parking at the site.

See also
 History of baseball in Allentown, Pennsylvania
 List of city parks and recreation facilities of Allentown, Pennsylvania
 List of historic places in Allentown, Pennsylvania
 Sports in Allentown, Pennsylvania

References 

1939 establishments in Pennsylvania
Minor league baseball venues
Sports venues in Allentown, Pennsylvania
Baseball venues in Pennsylvania
Softball venues in Pennsylvania
Tourist attractions in Allentown, Pennsylvania
Sports venues completed in 1939